Michael Earl Mock (born February 25, 1955) is a former American football linebacker. He played for the New York Jets in 1978.

References

1955 births
Living people
American football linebackers
Texas Tech Red Raiders football players
New York Jets players